Connecticut's 119th House of Representatives district elects one member of the Connecticut House of Representatives. It encompasses parts of Orange and Milford and has been represented by Republican Kathy Kennedy since 2019.

Recent elections

2020

2018

2016

2014

2012

References

119